Anoushka Shankar (born 9 June 1981) is a British-American sitar player and music artist. She was the youngest and first woman to receive a British House of Commons Shield; she has had 9 Grammy Awards nominations and was the first musician of Indian origin to perform live and to serve as presenter at the ceremony. She performs across multiple genres and styles - classical and contemporary, acoustic and electronic.

Early life
Shankar was born in London and her childhood was divided between London and Delhi. She is the daughter of Sukanya Shankar and Indian sitar maestro Ravi Shankar, who was 61 when she was born. Through her father, she is also the half-sister of American singer Norah Jones (born Geetali Norah Shankar), and Shubhendra "Shubho" Shankar, who died in 1992.

As a teenager, Shankar lived in Encinitas, California, and attended San Dieguito High School Academy. A 1999 honours graduate and Homecoming Queen, she decided to pursue a career in music rather than attend college.

Career

Shankar began training on the sitar with her father Ravi Shankar at the age of eight. As part of her training, she began accompanying him on the tanpura at his performances from the age of ten, soaking up the music and becoming acclimated to the stage. She gave her first public sitar performance on 27 February 1995 at the age of 13, at Siri Fort in New Delhi as part of her father's 75th birthday celebration concert. For this solo debut, she was accompanied by tabla maestro Zakir Hussain. Her first experience in the recording studio came that same year when Angel Records released a special four-CD box set called In Celebration, to mark her father's birthday. By the age of fourteen, she was accompanying her father at concerts around the world. At fifteen, she assisted her father on the landmark album Chants of India, produced by George Harrison. Under both their guidance, she was in charge of notation and eventually of conducting the performers who took part in the recording. After this experience, the heads of Angel Records came to her parents' home to ask to sign her, and Shankar signed her first exclusive recording contract with Angel/EMI when she was sixteen.

She released her first album, Anoushka, in 1998, followed by Anourag in 2000. In 1999 Shankar graduated from high school with honours, but decided against university in favour of beginning to tour as a solo artist. Both Shankar and her half-sister Norah Jones were nominated for Grammy awards in 2003 when Anoushka became the youngest nominee in the World Music category for her third album, Live at Carnegie Hall.

Having released three albums of Indian classical music, Shankar took several years away from recording and focused her energy on establishing herself as a solo concert performer outside of her father's ensemble. In that time, she toured worldwide, playing an average of 50–60 concerts per year. 2005 brought the release of her fourth album RISE, her first self-produced, self-composed, non-classical album, earning her another Grammy nomination in the Best Contemporary World Music category. In February 2006 she became the first Indian to play at the Grammy Awards, playing material from RISE.

Shankar, in collaboration with Indian producer, composer and musician, Karsh Kale, released Breathing Under Water on 28 August 2007. It is a mix of classical sitar and electronica beats and melodies. Notable guest vocals included her paternal half-sister Norah Jones, Sting, and her father, who performed a sitar duet with her.

In 2011 Shankar signed with record label Deutsche Grammophon as an exclusive artist. This marked the beginning of a prolific recording and creative period for Shankar, during which time she continued to refine the sitar sound and musical ideas she had become known for. She earned a third Grammy Award nomination in 2013 for Traveller, an exploration of the shared history between flamenco and Indian classical music, which was produced by Javier Limón and featured artists such as Buika, Pepe Habichuela and Duquende. As Shankar had begun to do with Rise, she created a specially handpicked ensemble of musicians with whom to perform this cross-genre music, and played over a hundred concerts worldwide in support of Traveller. In 2013 she released a personal album called Traces of You, which was released several months after the passing of her father Ravi Shankar. Produced by Nitin Sawhney, and featuring her half-sister Norah Jones as the sole vocal performer, Traces of You earned Shankar a fourth Grammy nomination in the World Music category. In July 2015 Shankar released Home, her first purely classical album of Indian Ragas. Self-composed and produced, Home was recorded over a week in October 2014 in Shankar's new, purpose-built home-studio.

Following Home, Shankar released Land of Gold (2016) – her fourth album with Deutsche Grammophon; the global refugee crisis and the intense contrast between being able to provide for her newly born second child and the sense of powerlessness to alleviate the injustice and pain happening as the world looked on provided the inspiration for this heartfelt and hopeful album. The release features different types of contributions – from the vocal of MIA and Alev Lenz, to the monologue of Remain the Sea by Veteran British actress Vanessa Redgrave. There is also a strong cinematic influence in the videos, lent by the production of film Director Joe Wright (Pride & Prejudice, Atonement). Land of Gold remixes came out in the same year with remixes by Mowgli, Karsh Kale, Matt Robertson, Grain and East London-based collective Shiva Soundsystem.

In 2019 came the compilation Reflections, a 20-year retrospective album that revisits the best of Shankar's cross cultural back catalogue with Deutsche Grammophon, including many of her previous collaborations with fellow artists and producers.

The release of Love Letters in 2020 marked a different direction for Shankar. The co-produced EP is a compilation of songs written across 2018-19 and released on her new record label, Mercury KX. Several guest musicians feature on the EP, including singer and co-producer Alev Lenz, twin sister vocal duo Ibeyi, singer and cellist Ayanna Witter-Johnson, Indian singer Shilpa Rao, Brooklyn-based mastering engineer Heba Kadry (Björk, Slowdive) and British audio mastering engineer Mandy Parnell (Aphex Twin, The XX).

Shankar regularly collaborates with electronic music producer Gold Panda, percussionist Manu Delago and the Britten Sinfonia strings, all of which appeared, including Shankar, at the 2020 BBC Proms at Royal Albert Hall.

Throughout her career, Shankar has made many guest appearances on recordings by other artists, among them Sting, Lenny Kravitz, Thievery Corporation and Nitin Sawhney.

In 2010 she collaborated with Jazz legend Herbie Hancock, on his album The Imagine Project, alongside Pink, India.Arie, Jeff Beck, John Legend, Chaka Khan, The Chieftains, Wayne Shorter and Dave Matthews. The project was also filmed for a documentary accompanying the release and showing him working with the artists who collaborated on the project.

In the same year she featured on the track "Rebirth by Indian" fusion group MIDIval Punditz. In 2012 the album Area 52 by Rodrigo & Gabriela's album featured a guest appearance from Shankar's sitar improvisation. She performed the Raga Piloo with violinist Patricia Kopatchinskaja during a concert in Konzerthaus Berlin, Germany in April 2016 - the song was originally composed, performed and recorded by Ravi Shankar as a duet with Yehudi Menuhin on the album West Meets East, Volume 2 in 1968.

More recently, she has played on the track "Ama La" on the Dalai Lama's first music album, Inner World that was released in July 2020 on his 85th birthday.

Shortly after she appeared on Peradam, the third and final instalment of album trilogy Perfect Vision by Patti Smith and Soundwalk Collective alongside Charlotte Gainsbourg, and Tenzin Choegyal; she also collaborated with Grammy-Nominated Deva Premal on the song "Prabhujee", released in November 2020.

On 13 November 2020, Shankar was featured on "Stop Crying Your Heart Out" as part of the BBC Radio 2's Allstars' Children in Need charity single. The single debuted at number 7 on the Official UK Singles Chart and number 1 on both the Official UK Singles Sales Chart and the Official UK Singles Download Chart.

Classical Sitar
Anoushka has always continued to tour and perform as a classical sitarist, both within purely Indian classical ensemble but also as a soloist championing her father's compositions with the world's leading orchestras including the London Symphony Orchestra, New York Philharmonic, Berliner Philharmoniker, MDR Sinfonieorchester, Metropole Orkest and Lucerne Symphony.

Shankar is the sole performer of Ravi Shankar's First and Second Concertos for Sitar and Orchestra since the composer’s death, performing multiple times under the leadership of esteemed conductors such as legendary Zubin Mehta, Jules Buckley, Kristjan Järvi, and Jakob Hrusa. In January 2009 she was the sitar soloist alongside the Orpheus Chamber Orchestra premiering her father's Third Concerto for Sitar and Orchestra, and in July 2010 she premiered Ravi Shankar's first symphony for sitar and orchestra with the London Philharmonic Orchestra at London's Royal Festival Hall.

She has also performed in duets with artists such as violinist Joshua Bell, in a sitar-cello duet with Mstislav Rostropovich, and with flutist Jean-Pierre Rampal, playing both sitar and piano.

Film Scoring 
Shankar took her first steps into scoring with a Bengali lullaby composed for Director Joe Wright's Anna Karenina, starring Keira Knightley, Jude Law and Tannishtha Chatterjee.

Shankar's progression into composition for films led her to score the British Film Institute's restoration of rare Indian silent Shiraz: A Romance of India (Original 1928, scored in 2017). She also performed the composition live at screenings of the movie that was premiered as 2017's London Film Festival Archive Gala and then appeared at the global film festival We Are One on 2 June 2020.

In the same year (2017) she co-wrote and performed on the end-title song “Gain the Ocean" for the Judi Dench-starred British-American biographical drama Victoria & Abdul directed by Stephen Frears.

More recently she co-composed the score to Mira Nair's (Monsoon Wedding, Vanity Fair, The Namesake) BBC 6-part series A Suitable Boy (2020); based on Vikram Seth's classic novel of the same title, the show developed by Andrew Davies (Bridget Jones's Diary, War and Peace, Les Misérables) stars Tabu, Tanya Maniktala and Ishaan Khatter.

Acting, writing and narrating
Shankar has also ventured into acting (Dance Like a Man, 2004) and writing. She wrote a biography of her father, Bapi: The Love of My Life, in 2002 and has contributed to various books. As a columnist she wrote monthly columns for India's First City Magazine for three years, and spent one year as a weekly columnist for India's second largest newspaper, the Hindustan Times.

She narrated Stolen Innocence: India's Untold Story of Human Trafficking, a 2017 documentary by filmmakers Chris Davis, Casey Allred and Lindsay Daniels, telling the true stories of young women who escaped from sex slavery in India and Nepal.

Benefit concerts
Over the span of her musical career, Shankar has frequently been invited to perform for benefit concerts around the world.

In 2000 she shared the stage with Madonna and Bryan Adams st the Summer's Tibetan Peace Garden Benefit concert organised in London by Sting's wife Trudie Styler; on 29th November 2002, Shankar was the featured performer of the "Indian" half of the Concert for George, a posthumous tribute to the life and music of George Harrison, held at the Royal Albert Hall in London. She opened the show by playing a solo sitar instrumental titled "Your Eyes". Also on the sitar, she performed George Harrison's "The Inner Light" with Jeff Lynne. Lastly, she conducted a new composition, Arpan, written by her father. The composition featured Eric Clapton playing acoustic guitar, and a full orchestra of Indian and Western musicians. The concert was modelled after Ravi Shankar's benefit concert with Harrison, the 1971 Concert for Bangladesh.

Also in 2002 she performed alongside Patti Labelle, Elton John, Nina Simone and others for Rock for the Rainforest, the benefit concert organized by Sting and Trudie Styler at Carnegie Hall.

Shankar was invited by Richard Gere and Philip Glass to perform in a concert at Avery Fisher Hall in 2003 in aid of the Healing the Divide: A Concert for Peace and Reconciliation.

Shankar and Jethro Tull postponed a concert scheduled for 29 November 2008 in Mumbai after the 2008 Mumbai attacks. They reorganised the performance as A Billion Hands Concert, a benefit performance for victims of the attacks, and held it on 5 December 2008. Shankar commented on this decision stating that: "As a musician, this is how I speak, how I express the anger within me [...] our entire tour has been changed by these events and even though the structure of the concert may remain the same, emotionally perhaps we are saying a lot more."

In 2016 Shankar helped gather names and signed Letter to the Guardian for a call for action to help Syrian Refugees.

In February 2018 she read a poem as part of Letters Live for Help Refugees, alongside other performers such as Gemma Arterton, Andrew Scott, Jade Anouka, Cara Theobaold, Florence Welch, Chiwetel Ejiofor, Joely Richardso among many others.

In July 2018 she embarked on a short US tour of Land of Gold to help raise funds for the nonprofit organization Help Refugees.

Awards and honours
 British House of Commons Shield, 1998
 Woman of the Year awarded on International Women's Day 2003 in India
 Named as one of 20 Asian Heroes by the Asia edition of Time in 2004
 First Grammy Nomination in 2003 in the World Music category for her third-album, Live at Carnegie Hall. She was the youngest-ever nominee in this category.
In 2004 she received National Award nomination for best supporting actress in the film Dance Like A Man in 2004.
 In 2005 she was nominated for another Grammy, in the Best Contemporary World Music category for her fourth album RISE.
 In 2012 she won Best Artist in the Songlines Music Award for her album Traveller.
 In 2013 she was nominated for her third Grammy, in the Best World Music category for her album Traveller.
 In 2014 she was nominated for a fourth Grammy in the Best World Music category for her album Traces of You.
 In 2015 she was nominated for a fifth Grammy in the Best World Music Category for her album "Home".
 In 2016 she was nominated for a sixth Grammy in the Best World Music Category for her album "Land of Gold".
 In 2017 she won the Eastern Eye Arts, Culture & Theatre Awards (ACTA) Award for Music for outstanding achievements in the Indian classical and progressive world music scenes.
Asteroid 292872 Anoushankar, discovered by Italian amateur astronomer Silvano Casulli, was named in her honour. The official  was published by the Minor Planet Center on 12 January 2017.
In 2018 she won the 3rd Eastern Eye Arts, Culture & Theatre Awards (ACTA) for the score to 1928 BFI film ‘Shiraz’.
In July 2021 she received the Honorary Membership of the Royal Academy of Music (Hon RAM).
In November 2020 she was nominated for the RTS (Royal Television Society) Craft & Design Awards 2020 for the music she and Alex Heffes composed for A Suitable Boy, A Lookout Point Production for BBC One.
In 2021 she was nominated for a seventh Grammy in the Best World Music Category for her album "Love Letters".
In 2021 she was nominated for an Ivor Novello Award for 'A Suitable Boy' Score.
In 2023 she became the inaugural Visiting Professor of Music Business at the University of Oxford's Faculty of Music.

Activism

Shankar is an activist working with multiple causes and charitable organisations, in particular supporting women and refugees; she is also an advocate for animal rights.

One Billion Rising

In 2013, responding to the horrific gang-rape of a young girl in Delhi, whom the Indian media referred to as Nirbhaya, Shankar threw her weight behind an online campaign One Billion Rising on Change.org, demanding an end to crime against women. As part of the campaign, she released a video in which she revealed she had been sexually abused for many years as a child.

UNHCR – The UN Refugee Agency

In 2018 she joined musicians, actors and artists such as Patrick Stewart, Peter Capaldi, Vivienne Westwood, Anish Kapoor, The Kaiser Chiefs and many others in a call to urge MPs to attend the Refugees Family Reunion Bill and ensure refugee families torn apart by war and conflict are reunited.

Help Refugees

Shankar is one of the faces of the Help Refugees campaign to raise funds and awareness for the refugee crisis worldwide.

The Circle NGO

Shankar has joined the charity, founded by Annie Lennox in 2008, working to achieve equality for women and girls across the world.

The F-List

In 2020 Shankar was announced as the inaugural President of the F-List: a UK database created to help bridge the gender-gap in music.

Pin Your Thanks

In 2020 Shankar designed a pin for the "Pin Your Thanks" initiative that supports the National Health Service (NHS) charities during the COVID-19 pandemic in the United Kingdom.

The Walk

She is an ambassador for The Walk, an international artistic project in support of refugees.

UN World Food Programme

In 2007 the UN World Food Programme appointed Shankar as spokesperson to raise awareness about the issues of hunger and malnutrition, especially among children, in India.

PETA

Shankar and her father, also a supporter of animal rights, appeared in a thirty-second public-service announcement against animal suffering for People for the Ethical Treatment of Animals (PETA).

Personal life
Shankar is the daughter of Pandit Ravi Shankar and Sukanya Rajan, and the half-sister of Norah Jones. She grew up in the US, the UK, and India. In 2010, she married British director Joe Wright. They have two sons (born 2011 and 2015). They separated in December 2017 and finalised their divorce in September 2019. She lives in London with her sons.

Discography

Studio albums

Remix albums
 Rise Remixes (2006)

Live and compilations
 Full Circle: Carnegie Hall 2000 (2000)
 Live at Carnegie Hall (2001)
 Concert for George (2003)
 Live in Concert at the Nehru Park, New Delhi (2005)
 Healing the Divide: A Concert for Peace and Reconciliation (2007)

Features
 "Adarini" – In Celebration composed by Ravi Shankar, 1995
 Chants Of India – Ravi Shankar; George Harrison, featuring Anoushka as Conductor & Assistant, 1997
 Sacred Love – by Sting, 2003
 8 classical ragas performed on ShankaRagamala composed by Ravi Shankar, 2005
 "Rebirth" – Co-written by Gaurav Raina, Tapan Raj and Anoushka Shankar. Midival Punditz – MIDIval Times, 2005
 "Beloved" – by Anoushka Shankar remixed by Thievery Corporation – Versions, 2006
 "Bring It On" – Featuring Anoushka Shankar on sitar. Written by Lenny Kravitz, It Is Time for a Love Revolution, 2007
 "Mandala" – Featuring Anoushka Shankar on sitar. Co-written by Hilton Garza, Radio Retaliation, 2008
 "Charu Keshi Rain" – Co-written by Nitin Sawhney and Anoushka Shankar, London Undersound, 2008
 "Variant Moods – Duet For Sitar & Violin" (abridged version) Written by Ravi Shankar, At Home With Friends by Joshua Bell, 2009
 "Ixtapa" – Rodrigo y Gabriela & C.U.B.A. featuring Anoushka Shankar on sitar, Area 52, 2012
 "Lucy In The Sky With Diamonds" – Miloš Karadaglić featuring Anoushka Shankar, on the album Blackbird: The Beatles Album, 2016
 "Stop Crying Your Heart Out", Children in Need charity single, 2020

References

Further reading

External links

 
 The show must go on – Video interview about A Billion Hands Concert
 Anoushka Shankar: Different Worlds, One Musical Language – Video interview about performing Ravi Shankar's Concerto No. 3 for Sitar and Orchestra.
 Anoushka Shankar Live : Gypsy Music From India to Spain on Medici.tv

1981 births
Living people
Musicians from London
Sitar players
Angel Records artists
Deutsche Grammophon artists
EMI Classics and Virgin Classics artists
English emigrants to the United States
English women singer-songwriters
American women singer-songwriters
British people of Indian descent
American women musicians of Indian descent
Bengali musicians
British people of Bengali descent
American people of Bengali descent
Mercury KX artists
Pupils of Ravi Shankar
Expatriate musicians in India
British expatriates in India
American expatriates in India
American classical musicians of Indian descent
20th-century women composers
21st-century women composers
20th-century English composers
21st-century English composers
20th-century American composers
21st-century American composers
20th-century British women musicians
21st-century British women musicians
20th-century American women musicians
21st-century American women musicians